Yu Meiren may refer to:
 Consort Yu (Xiang Yu's wife) (died 202 BCE), Xiang Yu's wife
 Beautiful Lady Yu (Han dynasty) (died 179 AD), Emperor Shun of Han's consort and Emperor Chong's mother
 Yu Meiren, a standard template of the Chinese poetry ci
 The Mermaid (1965 film), a 1965 Hong Kong film